Shees Park (or Shis Park) is a recreational park near the village of Shis in Khor Fakkan, Sharjah, the United Arab Emirates. 

The park was constructed in 8 months. It covers an area of 11,362 m2, has a 25-meter-high artificial waterfall and includes 506 meters of walkways throughout three mountain terraces connected by stone stairs leading to the main viewing platform at a height of 30 meters from the main park level. It includes a children's play area, 32 shaded seating areas for families, an outdoor theater that can accommodate 70 people and a barbecue area.

It was inaugurated by the ruler of Sharjah, Sheikh Dr Sultan bin Muhammad Al Qasimi, on 15 October, 2020.

Gallery

See also 
 Sharjah National Park
 Jebel Hafeet National Park, Abu Dhabi
 Mangrove National Park, Abu Dhabi

References 

National parks of the United Arab Emirates
Geography of the Emirate of Sharjah
Tourist attractions in the Emirate of Sharjah